Lavdas is a village and a community of the Grevena municipality. Before the 2011 local government reform it was a part of the municipality of Theodoros Ziakas, of which it was a municipal district. The 2011 census recorded 49 residents in the village. The community of Lavdas covers an area of 10.671 km2.

See also
 List of settlements in the Grevena regional unit

References

Populated places in Grevena (regional unit)